Abadi is a surname. Notable people with the surname include:

Abby Abadi (b. 1977), Malaysian actress
Ebrahim Abadi (1934–2019), Iranian stage and cinema actor
Fritzie Abadi (1915–2001), Syrian American painter
Haider Al-Abadi (b. 1952), Iraqi politician
Martín Abadi (b. 1963), Argentinian computer scientist
Mohammad Abadi (b. 1990), Syrian footballer
Shakir Shuja Abadi (b. 1968), Pakistani poet
Shirin Ebadi (b. 1947), Iranian lawyer and Nobel laureate
Yitzchak Abadi (b. 1933) Orthodox Jewish Rabbi and Posek
Odette Abadi  (24 August 1914 – 29 July 1999), co-founder of Réseau Marcel